George Campbell Read (January 9, 1788August 22, 1862) was a United States Naval officer who served on Old Ironsides during the War of 1812 and commanded vessels in actions off the Barbary Coast and India. Read eventually rose to the rank of rear admiral.

Early life
George Campbell Read was born in Ireland and emigrated to the United States at an early age. (Some references give his birthplace as Glastonbury, Connecticut.) At the age of 16, Read entered service in the United States Navy as a midshipman on April 2, 1804.

Military career
Early in his service, because of his relationship with the captain, he was suspected of being an informant concerning a fight between two lieutenants: Melancthon Taylor Woolsey and William Burrows. For a long time, Woolsey and the other officers shunned Read, who endured the treatment without complaint. When it was eventually learned that it was the captain's clerk and not Read who had informed, Woolsey apologized to him and asked why he remained silent about the real informant. Read replied, "That would have been doing the very thing for which you blamed me, Mr. Woolsey: turning informer." Thereafter, Woolsey referred to this incident as an example of Read's great self-restraint and self-respect.

On April 25, 1810, after six years of service, Read was promoted to lieutenant, and he served aboard USS Constitution under Commodore Isaac Hull during the War of 1812. When Constitution defeated the British warship  on August 19, 1812, he was detailed by Hull to board the English vessel and accept her surrender. Two months later, on October 25, Read was serving under Commodore Stephen Decatur aboard  when they defeated the British warship . As a lieutenant, Read commanded the brig  during the Algerian War of 1815. He was promoted to commander in 1816, and served in the Mediterranean and off the coast of Africa. After a promotion to captain in 1825, he took command of USS Constitution. From 1838 to 1839 Read took part in retaliatory actions against the pirates and raiders who preyed on American shipping in India. he commanded the Second Sumatran Expedition which was undertaken in response to the massacre of the merchant ship Eclipse.

From 1839 to 1846, Read commanded the Philadelphia Naval School. As commander there, he served on a Naval board with Commodores Thomas ap Catesby Jones, Matthew C. Perry, and Captains Elie A. F. La Vallette and Isaac Mayo for the examination of midshipmen entitled to promotion. He next commanded the African Squadron from 1846 to 1847 and the Mediterranean Squadron from 1847 to 1849. When the American Civil War broke out in 1861, Read was again in charge of the Philadelphia Naval Asylum. Read was promoted to rear admiral in July 1862. He died one month later, on August 22, after 58 years of Naval service. He is buried in Laurel Hill Cemetery in Philadelphia, Pennsylvania. His wife, Elizabeth, the daughter of Captain Richard Dale, died on March 1, 1863, and was buried beside him.

USS Commodore Read

The naval patrol ship USS Commodore Read was named in honor of Read. Formerly a ferryboat, it was purchased by the Navy on 19 August 1863, refitted at New York Navy Yard and commissioned on 8 September 1863. The ship served with the Potomac Flotilla during the American Civil War until 20 July 1865.

See also

Notes

References
Murrell, William Meacham, Cruise Of The Frigate Columbia Around The World Under The Command Of Commodore George C. Read. Benjamin B. Mussey, Boston, Mass, 1840.

Further reading

United States Navy admirals
Union Navy admirals
United States Navy personnel of the War of 1812
People from Glastonbury, Connecticut
People of Connecticut in the American Civil War
People of Pennsylvania in the American Civil War
Military personnel from Philadelphia
1788 births
1862 deaths
Military personnel from Connecticut
Burials at Laurel Hill Cemetery (Philadelphia)
Irish emigrants to the United States (before 1923)
Commanders of the USS Constitution